The Turkish Angora ('Ankara cat') is a breed of domestic cat. Turkish Angoras are one of the ancient, natural breeds of cat, having originated in central Anatolia (Ankara Province in modern-day Turkey). The breed has been documented as early as the 17th century. Outside of the United States, the breed is usually referred to as simply the Angora or Ankara cat. These cats have slender and elegant bodies. In the winter they are perfectly camouflaged in the snow, and are often mistaken for a snow weasel as they grow fairly long.

History

Like all domestic cats, Turkish Angoras descended from the African wildcat (Felis lybica). Their ancestors were among the cats that were first domesticated in the Fertile Crescent.

Longhaired cats were imported to Britain and France from Asia Minor, Persia and Russia as early as the late 16th century. The Turkish Angora was recognized as a distinct breed in Europe by the 17th century. However, there is a strong connection between Angoras and Persians. Charles Catton, in the 1788 book Animals Drawn from Nature and Engraved in Aqua-tinta, gave "Persian cat" and "Angora cat" as alternative names for the same breed.

The Persian cat was developed from Turkish Angora mutations by British and American cat breeders. In 1903, F. Simpson wrote in The Book of the Cat:

The Angora of the 20th century was used for improvement in the Persian coat, but the type has always been divergent from the Persianparticularly as the increasingly flat-faced show cat Persian has been developed in the last few decades.

In the early 20th century, Atatürk Forest Farm and Zoo began a breeding program to protect and preserve pure white Angoras. The zoo particularly prized odd-eyed specimens; however, the cats were chosen only for their colorno other criterion was applied.

The Turkish Angora, which was brought to Canada in 1963, was accepted as a championship pedigreed breed in 1973 by the Cat Fanciers' Association. However, until 1978 only white Angoras were recognized. Today, all North American registries accept the Turkish Angora in many colors and patterns. While their numbers are still relatively small, the gene pool is continually growing.

Breeders in Turkey feel that the cat's fine-boned version of its natural breed is unrepresentative of the true Turkish cats, which are much sturdier. American "Turkish" Angoras have only a minimal remnant of the original Atatürk Forest Farm and Zoo DNA, and are only "purebred on paper".

Appearance

Turkish Angoras have short, soft coats, and elegant, sinuous bodies. A young Turkish Angora may be mistaken for a snow weasel. Though it is known for a shimmery white coat and posh tail, Turkish Angoras can display a variety of colors. They come in tabby, black, chocolate brown, and smoke-colored varieties.

Eyes may be blue, green, amber, yellow, as well as heterochromatic. Ears are pointed, large and wide-set. The eyes are almond shaped and the profile forms two straight planes. The plumed tail is often carried upright, perpendicular to the back.

Behavior
Turkish Angoras are playful, intelligent, athletic and involved. They bond with humans, but often select a particular member of a family to be their constant companion, whom they are very protective of. They seek to be "helpful" in any way they can with their humans, and their intelligence can be at times remarkable, showing basic problem solving skills. They are easily trained because of their intelligence and desire to interact with humans.

Turkish Angoras are energetic, and often seek out "high ground" in the home. This perch is then used as a way to observe activity of the home. This can include tops of doors, refrigerators, bookshelves, and other furniture. Some ride on their owners' shoulders. Most get along well in homes with other animals or children, or homes with high activity.

Health

The gene responsible for the deaf white cat occurrence is present in most Turkish Angoras.

Some Turkish Angora kittens suffer from hereditary ataxia, a rare condition thought to be inherited as an autosomal recessive. The kittens affected by ataxia start showing signs of the condition at around 3 - 4 weeks, have shaky movements with lack of coordination, and do not survive to adulthood.

Another genetic illness that is rare but known to the breed is hypertrophic cardiomyopathy, which is a cardiac condition usually found in cats between the ages of two and six, with males being affected more commonly and more severely than females. In the Turkish Angora, the disease has not yet been studied at length, primarily due to its rarity of occurrence.

Genetics

A genetic study of pedigree cat breeds (using DNA taken from pedigreed cats in the U.S. and Europe) and worldwide random-bred populations showed the Turkish Van as a distinct population from the Turkish Angora despite their geographical association. The Turkish Angora was grouped with the pedigreed Egyptian Mau and random-bred Tunisian cats. Turkish random-bred cats were grouped with Israeli random-bred cats while the Turkish Van was grouped with Egyptian random-bred cats.
However, the UC Davis studied only American cat fancy registered Angoras rather than the "true" Turkish Angora or Ankara Kedisi directly from Turkey, and especially from the Ankara Zoo.

A genetic study published in 2012 included a few cats imported from Turkey. The study found that "Turkish- versus USA-originating Turkish Angoras (...) are resolved as separate breed populations." The American Turkish Angoras are categorized as descendants of European random-bred cats, and cats imported from Turkey "were assigned to the Eastern Mediterranean" group.

In popular culture
Mewsette, the protagonist of Warner Bros. and United Productions of America's 1962 animated feature film Gay Purr-ee is a Turkish Angora.

Duchess, the protagonist of Walt Disney Pictures's 1970 animated feature film The Aristocats is also a Turkish Angora and so is her kitten daughter, Marie.

Sawyer, one of the protagonists of Warner Bros.' 1997 animated feature film, Cats Don't Dance is an anthropomorphic Turkish Angora.

Father John Misty recorded the song "Goodbye Mr Blue" on his 2022 Album Chloë and the Next 20th Century about the life and death of a Turkish Angora and how it related to the loss of another relationship.

References

External links
The Real Turkish Angora
The Cat Fanciers' Association: Breed descriptionTurkish Angora
Fanciers: Turkish Angora

Cat breeds
Cat breeds originating in Turkey
Natural cat breeds